Under the Shadow is a 2016 Persian-language psychological horror film written and directed by Iranian-born Babak Anvari as his directorial debut. A mother and daughter are haunted by a mysterious evil in 1980s Tehran, during the War of the Cities. The film stars Narges Rashidi, Avin Manshadi, Bobby Naderi, Ray Haratian, and Arash Marandi.

Produced by British film company Wigwam Films, the film is an international co-production between Qatar, Jordan, and the United Kingdom. The film premiered at the 2016 Sundance Film Festival and has been acquired by US streaming service Netflix. The film received critical acclaim. It was selected as the British entry for the Best Foreign Language Film at the 89th Academy Awards but it was not nominated.

Plot
In 1980s war-torn post-revolutionary Tehran, former medical student Shideh is barred from resuming her studies because of her involvement with student leftist groups. She gets rid of her medical textbooks, but keeps a book of medical physiology given to her by her deceased mother. As the war intensifies, she elects to stay in the city with her daughter, Dorsa, despite the protests of her husband Iraj, a doctor called into military service. Iraj wants Shideh to stay with his parents in a safer part of the country, but she refuses. Iraj promises Dorsa that her favorite doll, Kimia, will protect her.

A boy moves in with the neighboring Ebrahimi family, who are his cousins; his parents were killed in an attack. During a shelling, he whispers something into Dorsa's ear and hands her a charm to ward off evil spirits. Dorsa tells her mother that the boy talked about the legend of the Djinn; Shideh throws the charm away. She visits Mrs. Ebrahimi, who reveals that the boy has been mute since the death of his parents. Dorsa develops a fever and she and Shideh are plagued by nightmares. Shideh's PTSD grows worse from the trauma of living in a warzone but she is in denial.

A missile strikes their building and Kimia goes missing in the commotion. Dorsa's behavior becomes more disturbed; she insists there is a strange presence in the house, and repeatedly tries to get into the upper floor, believing that Kimia is there. The neighbors begin to leave to escape the fighting. Mrs. Ebrahimi warns Shideh that djinns can possess humans, and will steal a beloved personal item of their victims. The Ebrahimis leave too and Dorsa and Shideh are the only two inhabitants left in the building. Shideh's own items start to go missing. Her nightmares escalate to visions involving a chador that moves like a ghost. Dorsa admits to seeing the same apparitions. Shideh finally wants to leave but Dorsa refuses until Kimia is found. Shideh receives a call seemingly from Iraj but the caller begins to berate her for being a poor mother. Shideh finds a mutilated Kimia, which upsets Dorsa, so she repairs Kimia with tape. When they are about to leave though, another air raid siren goes off.

While going down to the shelter, she hears Dorsa's screams. She panics, believing that the Dorsa she left with is an apparition, and returns home to find the real one. She sees Dorsa under their bed but discovers that it is an apparition. Escaping to the shelter, she finds the real Dorsa. The two are attacked by the chador apparition and escape to the car. Shideh drives them to Iraj's parents. However, it is revealed that Kimia's detached head was left behind and Shideh's medical textbook is still in the djinn's possession, implying they may still be harassed.

Cast

Narges Rashidi as Shideh
Avin Manshadi as Dorsa
Bobby Naderi as Iraj
Ray Haratian as Mr. Ebrahimi
Arash Marandi as Dr. Reza
Bijan Daneshmand as Director
Aram Ghasemy as Mrs Ebrahami
Saussan Farrokhnia as Mrs Fakur
Behi Djanati Atai as Pargol
Hamidreza Djavdan as Mr Fakur
Nabil Koni as Mr Bijari
Karam Rashayda as Mehdi
Zainab Zamamiri as Sogand
Khaled Zamameri as Ali
Adel Darageh as pot-bellied man
Jalal Izzat as glazier
Suhaila Armani as female prison guard
Amir Hossein Ranjbar as young soldier
Houshang Ranjbar as senior police officer

Also in the cast are Ehab Rousan and Rami Mehyar as revolutionary guards, Ahmad Mehyar and Abu Rashed as paramedics and Zeid Jad and Motasem Younis  as fire-fighters.

Release
The film's global premiere was in January 2016 at the Sundance Film Festival. The rights to the film were subsequently acquired by streaming service Netflix; Vertical Entertainment and XYZ Films will assist in VOD releases and a limited theatrical showing starting on 7 October in the United States.

Critical reception
Review aggregator website Rotten Tomatoes reports an approval rating of 99% based on 92 reviews, with an average rating of 8/10. The site's critics' consensus reads: "Under the Shadow deftly blends seemingly disparate genres to deliver an effective chiller with timely themes and thought-provoking social subtext." On Metacritic, the film has an aggregated score of 83/100 based on 20 critic reviews, indicating "universal acclaim".

Eric Kohn, writing for IndieWire, said: "Jump scares and a frantic parent shielding her child from ominous supernatural forces: These tropes are hardly new to the horror genre, but they receive a fresh spin in 'Under the Shadow'". He noted some similarities between the film and two other horror films, A Girl Walks Home Alone at Night and The Babadook, and concluded that the film "smartly observes the emotions stirred up by a world defined by restrictions, and the terrifying possibility that they might be inescapable." Kevin Maher of The Times gave the film 3/5 stars, describing it as "an eerie, often unsettling, Iranian feminist horror film set in Tehran in 1988, at the height of the Iran-Iraq War."

David Rooney, writing for The Hollywood Reporter, described the film as "a gripping thriller about a mother and daughter under supernatural siege, which also doubles as a potent allegory for the insidious and very real anxieties of war, political turmoil and a society that oppresses women." He concluded: "Anvari deftly builds and sustains tension throughout, crafting a horror movie that respects genre conventions (right down to the safe/not safe ending), while firmly establishing its own distinctive identity."

In December 2016, film critic Mark Kermode named Under the Shadow his favorite film of 2016.

On 9 July 2016, the film received the H.R. Giger Narcisse prize for the Best Movie at the Neuchâtel International Fantastic Film Festival.

See also
 List of submissions to the 89th Academy Awards for Best Foreign Language Film
 List of British submissions for the Academy Award for Best Foreign Language Film

References

External links
 
 
 
 
 
 Under The Shadow soundtrack at Blacksands.Productions

2016 films
2016 horror films
British supernatural horror films
Jordanian horror films
Iranian horror films
Qatari speculative fiction films
2010s Persian-language films
2010s psychological horror films
2010s supernatural horror films
British supernatural thriller films
Vertigo Films films
Vertical Entertainment films
Films set in Tehran
2016 directorial debut films
2016 drama films
2010s British films